Akoka is a suburb of Yaba in Lagos State. It is known to be the hub of major tertiary institutions in Lagos including the University of Lagos and Federal College of Education (Technical), Akoka.

References

Populated places in Lagos